The Fall of Sparta is a Canadian drama film, directed by Tristan Dubois and released in 2018. Adapted from the young adult novel by Sébastien "Biz" Fréchette, the film stars Lévi Doré as Steeve Simard, a bookish and introverted teenager in Saint-Lambert, Quebec in his final year of high school.

Dubois and Biz opted to cast the film in a color-blind way, choosing the best actor for each role regardless of whether they corresponded to their character's stated or presumed 
racial background in the original novel.

Awards
Fanny Vachon received a Canadian Screen Award nomination for Best Makeup at the 7th Canadian Screen Awards. The film received three Prix Iris nominations at the 21st Quebec Cinema Awards, for Best Hairstyling (André Duval), Revelation of the Year (Doré) and Best Casting (Nathalie Boutrie).

References

External links
 

2018 films
2018 drama films
Canadian drama films
Films shot in Quebec
Films set in Quebec
Films based on Canadian novels
Saint-Lambert, Quebec
French-language Canadian films
2010s Canadian films